The People's Patriotic Movement "Power to the People!" (Narodno-patrioticheskoye dvizheniye «Vlast' — narodu!») was a political alliance in Russia.

History
Power to the People! was established in 1995 as an alliance of several groups, including the Russian All-People's Union, the For Social Equality movement, and the Popular Movement "Union". In the 1995 Russian legislative election, the alliance received 1.6% of the proportional representation vote, failing to cross the electoral threshold; it won nine constituency seats in the State Duma, and sided with other deputies in the  faction. The party did not contest any further elections; the Russian All-People's Union contested the 1999 Russian legislative election alone, winning two seats.

References

1995 establishments in Russia
Defunct political party alliances in Russia
Political parties established in 1995